Strigomerus is a genus of beetles in the family Carabidae, containing the following species:

 Strigomerus basilewskyanus Straneo, 1954
 Strigomerus cribratus Straneo, 1942
 Strigomerus damarensis (Kuntzen, 1919)
 Strigomerus ferrugineus (Peringuey, 1896)
 Strigomerus freyi Straneo, 1958
 Strigomerus girardi Straneo, 1991
 Strigomerus glaber Straneo, 1941
 Strigomerus katanganus Burgeon, 1935
 Strigomerus latibasis Straneo, 1958
 Strigomerus levisternus Straneo, 1942
 Strigomerus magnus (Straneo, 1951)
 Strigomerus marshalli Straneo, 1941
 Strigomerus meruensis Straneo, 1948
 Strigomerus parvicollis Straneo, 1939
 Strigomerus schoenherri (Dejean, 1831)
 Strigomerus sulcipennis (Dejean, 1831)
 Strigomerus trisetosus Straneo, 1986
 Strigomerus troglophilus Straneo, 1985

References

Pterostichinae